Depeh (also Romanized as Debeh) is a village in Mahru Rural District, Zaz va Mahru District, Aligudarz County, Lorestan Province, Iran. At the 2006 census, its population was 42, in 6 families.

References 

Towns and villages in Aligudarz County